Dastgerd Rural District is in Farrokhshahr District of Shahrekord County, Chaharmahal and Bakhtiari province, Iran. At the census of 2006, its population was 6,120 in 1,527 households; there were 6,090 inhabitants in 1,785 households at the following census of 2011; and in the most recent census of 2016, the population of the rural district was 4,350 in 1,341 households. The largest of its four villages was Dastgerd-e Emamzadeh, with 2,810 people.

References 

Shahrekord County

Rural Districts of Chaharmahal and Bakhtiari Province

Populated places in Chaharmahal and Bakhtiari Province

Populated places in Shahr-e Kord County